Kangar (Northern Malay: Kangaq; Jawi: كڠار) is the state capital and the largest town in Perlis, Malaysia. It has a population of 48,898 and an area of 2,619.4 ha. It is located next to the Thailand border, in the northernmost point of Peninsular Malaysia. It is situated by the Perlis River.

The town is also a gathering centre for the paddy rice production of the surrounding district. Its municipal government is unified with that of the neighbouring communities of Arau and Kaki Bukit. The centre of Kangar is Sena Province. The town is the smallest state capital in Malaysia and its inhabitants are mostly farmers and civil servants. Its industries include cement, saw milling, rubber, paper, and processing of sugar and prawns.

History 
Kangar existed from about 350 years ago, that is since 1653 when Kota Sena was built as the administrative centre for the 14th Sultan of Kedah, Sultan Muhyiddin Mansor Shah. Kangar was then a land port or pengkalan where boats and tongkangs anchor at the confluence of Perlis River, which runs through Kangar town to Kuala Perlis.

The name Kangar was derived from a type of tree. It was here at the port that trading was done, under a big tree that gave shade and respite to the traders. This tree that became a "witness" to many business deals was called Pohon Kangar. Every trader and merchant who came and went to this place began calling it the Pohon Kangar Port, in honour of the tree.

Demographics 

Majority of Kangar population speaks Perlis Malay which is a sub-dialect of Kedah Malay but also has its own unique features compared to those of neighbouring Kedah. 

The Han Chinese, the second largest community in Kangar are primarily Hokkien speaking. However, significant Mandarin and English is also well known amongst the local Chinese. In particular, Kangar, and by extension Perlis, is best known for its distinct Hokkien dialect, known as Penang Hokkien. Hokkien serves as the lingua franca of Kangar. 

Other languages spoken in Kangar includes Tamil, Telugu, Malayali as well as Punjabi and Hindi among the Kangar Indian population and Southern Thai by the Kedah-Siamese community.

Places of interest
Downtown Kangar is a mixture of old and new shophouses, and has an elegant colonial State Secretariat Building and clocktower from the 1930s. Other major landmarks are:
 PKENPS Tower @ K-PARC Kangar, the tallest building in Perlis
 Dato' Wan Ahmad's House
 Kubu Hill Recreational Park
 Malay World Weaponry Museum
 Medan Mountain
 Perlis Craft Cultural Complex
 State Museum and Heritage Hall
 Alwi Mosque, the former state mosque built in 1910
 Tuanku Syed Putra Stadium
 Gua Kelam, a cave in Kaki Bukit
 Snake Farm of Sungai Batu Pahat
 Bukit Ayer Recreational Park
 Wang Kelian - Next to Thai border
 Padang Besar Shopping Arcade - Duty Free Zone
 Royal Palace of Arau
 Fish Grill Food Court, Kuala Perlis
 Mini Putrajaya - State Assembly Building
 Gua Cenderawasih Park - Look out point

References

External links
 Municipal Council of Kangar

 
Northern Corridor Economic Region